Hitting a Straight Lick with a Crooked Stick is a compilation of recovered short stories written by Zora Neale Hurston. It was published in 2020 by Amistad: An Imprint of HarperCollins publishers. ISBN 978-0-06-291579-5

Foreword 
The foreword of Hitting a Straight Lick with a Crooked Stick was written August 19, 2019 by Tayari Jones. Jones gives readers a different perspective on Zora Neale Hurston's influence as a writer and how she chose to reveal herself through her writings. Through the stories of country folks, farmers, factory workers, and more, Hurston shares every capacity of the human experience. Jones also explains how Zora Neale Hurston shares her sense of humor with her audiences. One of the most important aspects of Zora Neale Hurston's writings, according to Jones, is that even the happiest and funniest characters still get the blues. Jones further goes into detail how she believes it is powerful that Hurston shares all walks of life through parents, lovers, children, spouses, and friends. Jones also explains in this source that Hurston found inspiration from her hometown of Eatonville, Florida and she makes no attempts to hide its identity. Hurston loved her hometown and her writings are both love letters and testimonies to where she grew up. According to Jones, Hurston's stories are timeless as she portrays people with underlying power and they must find that power within themselves. Lastly, Jones provides background information of how Alice Walker came to find Zora Neale Hurston's grave and Tayari Jones acknowledges how Hurston was a victim of racism and sexism.

Introduction 
The introduction of Zora Neale Hurston's, Hitting a Straight Lick with a Crooked Stick was written October 22, 2019 by Genevieve West. West paints how Hurston was ahead of her time in her critiques of race, gender, class, and art and that she used romance to explore these topics. West also explains Hurston's desire to create stories around the Great Migration and how the setting of urban environments played a role. She also outlines Hurston's academic experiences from high school to college at Howard University and how her education had a positive impact on her career as an author. Furthermore, the author gives an account on Zora Neale Hurston's family history and how her experiences would go on to influence her writings. West shares with readers how Hurston's short stories opened doors for her that allowed for great networking opportunities and eventually led to her finding a book publisher in the 1930s. The introduction is separated into sections called: "Hurston 'Really Did Get Born,'" "The Politics of Art in the Harlem Renaissance," "Interrogating the Politics of Gender and Class," "Exploring the Politics of Race and Class," and "The End of the Era."

Short Stories 
The short stories from Zora Neale Hurston's, Hitting a Straight Lick with a Crooked Stick are as follows:

John Redding Goes to Sea 
John Redding Goes to Sea follows the story of John Redding from childhood into adulthood. The main character longs to leave his hometown and explore the world. However, his mother, Matty, is possessive, superstitious, and claims to be ill in order to convince him to stay. His wife, Stella, also works with John's mother to prevent him from traveling. He finally relinquishes his dreams to remain home with his mother and wife, despite having worked to have an education for himself. John eventually develops the urge to join the Navy. The night he planned to speak to his family about enlisting, he is killed while working to build a bridge on the St. Johns River. His body is not recovered from the river and his wish of travel is finally granted in death as he floats along the river.

The Conversion of Sam 
This tale, tells the story of Sam Simpson, and his goal to win over Stella, who has recently moved from Virginia to Harlem. Sam does all he can to impress the young woman by relinquishing his lower class lifestyle and getting a more respectable job. Stella eventually accepts Sam's marriage proposal and they move into a quaint middle-class neighborhood together. Unfortunately, Sam is unable to fully give up his old habits and falls back into his old ways. He gambles away all of their money, but Sam is finally convinced to give up his unhealthy habits once and for all after Stella is injured when searching for him one night. Sam begs his old boss for his job back and he agrees, under the condition that Sam would not relapse again. Sam continuously must make the choice between what he has always been and who he wishes to become.

A Bit of Our Harlem 
A Bit of Our Harlem tells the story of a young, hunch-backed, orphan boy and a woman who has also lost both of her parents. They meet while the boy is selling cheap candy in the neighborhood. The two engage in a conversation that is filled with purity, sympathy, and a mutual respect for one another. The feeling of fellowship is something the woman desired, but had not found amongst her own class.

Drenched in Light 
This story takes place in 1920s Florida and follows Isis Watts and her desire to have fun instead of doing chores for her grandmother. During an afternoon of make believe she decides to follow a marching band to a nearby circus. Having the time of her life dancing, Isis joins the carnival. However, her grandmother eventually finds Isis at the carnival to demand she come home. After seeing her grandmother, Isis runs away, wanting to die. However, a white women and two men find her and ask her to come with them, saying that they want her sunshine to seep into their souls.

Spunk 
The early short story, Spunk, follows the main character who has a spunk for life and does as he pleases. Spunk Banks flaunts his affair with Lena Kanty to the town of Eatonville, FL, including Lena's husband, Joe Kanty. In this story, Joe is made fun of for appearing weak when another man takes his wife because he refuses to confront Spunk. When Joe finally works up the gumption to take action with a razor blade against him, Spunk retaliates by shooting him dead. Eventually Spunk goes to trial but is acquitted. However, Spunk convinces himself that Joe still seeks revenge in the form of a ghost. Spunk eventually meets his untimely end when he believes the spirit of Joe pushes him into a moving saw at his job.

Magnolia Flower 
Magnolia Flower is told from the perspective of the St. Johns River. This mystical tale follows the story of Bentley, an escaped, enslaved man. Bentley builds a village along the banks of the river and marries the Cherokee woman, Swift Deer, and they have a child who they name, Magnolia Flower. Years later, a man named John comes to the village with the desire to build a school. John and Magnolia Flower meet and fall in love. However, Bentley develops a strong distrust for John because of his similarities to white men. Magnolia Flower and John flee the village after he is sentenced to death, only to return to the river forty years later.

Black Death 
Black Death follows the story of Mrs. Boger's revenge against Beau Didley. Beau had led on her daughter, Docia and spreads rumors about her to the townspeople of Eatonville. Docia is a pregnant, unmarried woman, and rather than love her, Beau spreads the news of it to everyone and slanders her name. Mrs. Boger becomes furious at the treatment of her daughter and takes matters into her own hands. Mrs. Boger reclaims her power after visiting a witch doctor to purchase a deadly solution for Beau. The witch doctor's mirror shows Beau's death and the next day he is found dead with a mysterious burn mark on his chest. His death is ruled the result of natural causes and Mrs. Boger and Docia happily move to Jacksonville.

The Bone of Contention 
This story follows Joe Clarke as an owner of the town of Eatonville. Mr. Clarke called for a religious and political trial to decide whether Jim Weston was guilty of stealing and should be exiled from Eatonville. Joe led the trial. However, after allowing for rebuttals and arguments, he ended the trial early. As the owner of the town, Joe Clarke wanted to show his power by ending the trial and deciding the punishment for Mr. Weston himself.

Muttsy 
This tale follows the life of a man named, Muttsy. He falls in love with a woman named, Pinkie Jones, who recently moved to Eatonville, Florida from Harlem. Muttsy was a notorious gambler and finds him needing to change his ways in order to win over the woman he loves. Pinkie was guided by a strong moral compass and ran away from Muttsy even when he paid for a place for her to stay. Pinkie's resistance only made Muttsy's desire for her grow, making him realize he had to create a better life for himself if he wanted Pinkie to be a part of it. Muttsy is fueled by his possessiveness over Pinkie and finds himself an honest job, and finally persuaded Pinkie to marry him. However, after winning over the heart of the woman he desired, he fell back into his old bad habits and started gambling once again.

Sweat 
Sweat follows the story of Delia Jones, a hardworking, Christian woman who is being abused by her unfaithful husband, Syke Jones. He seeks to drive Delia away from their home by making her life miserable, yet she refuses to leave the home that she has worked so hard to maintain. Utilizing Delia's intense fear of snakes, Syke places a rattlesnake outside of their house and eventually in the laundry hamper as well. Syke's plans for the snake to bite and kill Delia made an ironic turn when Delia escapes and the rattlesnake bites him instead, causing him to have an agonizing death.

Under the Bridge 
Under the Bridge shares the story of a love triangle between 58-year-old Luke Mimms, his new wife, Vangie, and his 22-year-old son, Artie. Vangie is the stepmother to Artie and he had finally accepted her into their family. Their family unit had finally found peace with one another and all was well. Until, Vangie and Artie's relationship began to shift and advance into something more. Luke gradually became more and more jealous, for Vangie was the true love of his life. His jealousy and anger eventually led to him turning to hoodoo charms to slow the inevitability of Artie and Vangie's love. In a heated moment, Luke looked for his charm but found that it was missing, reversing the effects. Luke was then forced to watch Vangie and Artie's love hold into place. Artie and Vangie kissed one another, but each one of them felt emotionally betrayed by one another by the end of the tale.

'Possum or Pig? 
This short story follows an enslaved man who is loyal to his master, John. Pigs have gradually been disappearing from the master's house one by one. John grows suspicious and pays a visit to the enslaved man, discovering that he was the one stealing his pigs.

The Eatonville Anthology 
The Eatonville Anthology follows the lives of local townspeople in Eatonville. Each of the 14 mini stories follows couples, single men and women, and how they all interacted with one another in the town.

 The Pleading Woman: Mrs. Roberts begs for food from people in the community, including Joe Clarke. He grows irritated because he knows she has no need to beg because her husband provides very well for her. However, his needs cannot be satisfied and she returns to beg day after day.
 Turpentine Love: Jim Merchant continues to love his wife even after all her teeth have to be pulled out. One day his wife's mother comes with turpentine to treat one of Mrs. Merchant's fits. The turpentine accidentally leaked into her eyes, curing her ailments.
 Story III: A woman named Becky Moore has 11 children. The narrator blames the fathers of the children for the fact that Becky is an unmarried woman. The other mothers in town become afraid that this is contagious and refuse to let their children play with hers. 
 Tippy: In this short story, Syke Jones makes a reappearance. However, he is not the main character of this tale, instead his dog, Tippy, is. Tippy is described as the most interesting member of the Jones family and as a lover of bones. However, there is a death sentence hanging over Tippy's head for stealing meats and eggs. There have been many attempts on his life, but none have been successful. Despite all of this, Tippy still insists on being friendly to everyone he encounters.
 The Way of a Man with a Train: Old Man Anderson lives in the woods with no desire to ever lay his eyes upon a train. One day he decided to lead his horse to a railway station to finally see a train. Anderson is startled by the roaring engine and the oncoming smoke from the train and flees the station.
 Coon Taylor: This short story revolves around Coon Taylor, a thief in Eatonville who steals chickens, watermelons, and muskmelons. Coon Taylor had never been caught for his crimes until Joe Clarke took it upon himself to catch him in the act. The first attempt at catching Coon Taylor fails when Joe falls asleep and a melon is accidentally busted on his head. His second attempt is successful. Joe catches Coon stealing sugarcane and forces him to eat every last bit. Then Joe banishes him from Eatonville for 3 months.
 Village Fiction: Joe Lindsay, Lum Boger, and Brazzle compete to be considered the town liar. In Exhibit A, an anonymous person claims that they witnessed a doctor in Orlando remove the organs from a woman's body and successfully returned them to her body. 
 Story VIII: A man named Sewell keeps to himself and moves from place to place often. 
 Story IX: This story describes the abusive relationship between Joe Clarke and his wife. As a young man, Mr. Clarke would beat his wife publicly, but now waits until they get home. 
 Story X: A woman named Mrs. McDuffy would shout very loudly in church, but her husband would beat her at home. Elijah Moseley inquired about the situation and discovered that Mrs. McDuffy yells so loudly to spite her abusive husband.
 Double-Shuffle: This story focuses on the pre-foxtrot dancing style the people in Eatonville liked to dance before WWI. This dancing style was much cooler and rhythmic than the kind performed by white people.
 The Head of the Nail: This tale follows Daisy Taylor, who is known as the town flirt. She is having an affair with Mr. Crooms and relentlessly taunts his shy wife, Laura about it. One evening at a town gathering, Laura shocks the entire town when she attacks Daisy with an axe handle after more taunting. Laura, sticking up for herself, works, and Daisy leaves Eatonville for Orlando.
 Pants and Cal'line: In this story, a man named Mitchell Potts is unfaithful to his wife, Cal'line. He mocks her by buying shoes for his mistress, Miss Pheeny. However, Cal'line is known for being feisty and standing up for herself. One day, when Mitchell leaves to see his mistress, Cal'line follows him with an axe gripped in her hand.
 Story XIV: This short story is a retelling of the well-known children's story, "Br'er Rabbit." In Zora Neale Hurston's version, Mr. Dog and Mr. Rabbit are best friends but are both in love with Miss Nancy Coons. Nancy admires them both, but is drawn to Mr. Dog more because of his melodious singing voice. Mr. Rabbit is unable to sing but promises to help Mr. Dog so he could win Nancy's heart. He advises Mr. Dog to stick out his tongue, and when he does, Mr. Rabbit cuts it with a knife.

Book of Harlem 
Book of Harlem follows, Mandolin, who has recently moved from Georgia to Harlem looking for excitement. However, Mandolin was not welcomed with open arms. In order to help him fit in more, his roommate suggests that Mandolin change his clothes, hair, and learn how to dance to jazz. These changes work and Mandolin begins to attract women and he becomes introduced to the literary side of Harlem. Mandolin's friends rename him Panic, and he gradually becomes a well-respected figure in the art community under this new persona.

The Book of Harlem 
This story is very similar to Book of Harlem in the ways that Jazzbo has also moved from the South to Harlem, and he was given the advice to change himself in order to fit in and be accepted. A key difference between the two stories is that once Jazzbo attracts more women, he also finds sexual liberty. Jazzbo eventually marries a girl who was a self-proclaimed virgin.

The Back Room 
The story of The Back Room begins with Lilya Barkman, a woman living as a member of the elite class in Harlem. Lilya only cares about her youth and beauty. Her struggles begin when she must cope with the consequences of age. She was successful in her life because she could manipulate men with her good looks. She was a prize that no man could catch or marry. Upon realizing that there are younger women who may steal the affections of the men she seduces, she must make a choice to marry one of the men in her life- Bill or Bob. However, Lilya is too late. They both grew tired of her stringing them along and fell in love with other women, leaving Lilya to age alone.

Monkey Junk 
In this short story, a man living in Harlem claims he will never marry because he knows the "truth" of how women are. However, one day he finds a woman who tries to win him over with money. He failed to recognize that she was only a greedy woman and married her. She eventually turned to other men for money, betraying their marriage. The man attempts to leave her and take all the money. While in court, the man acts overly confident and the woman convinces the judge that she has misfortunes that require more financial support. In the end, the woman is victorious and the man is forced to leave Harlem penniless and move to the South.

The Country in the Women 
Caroline and Mitchell Potts have recently moved from a small Florida town to Harlem. Caroline is a tough woman who does not tolerate disrespect. She is described as temperamental and unpredictable. Mitchell is a notorious cheat and believed that Caroline would quit interfering with his affairs after moving away from their rural town in the south. However, Caroline remains steadfast in her ways and Mitchell grew frustrated with her unwillingness to conform to the culture of city life in the north. Mitchell continues on with his affairs and claims to have change Caroline's ways. However, one day Caroline sought revenge by following Mitchell and his mistress with an axe. Mitchell quickly learned that the country indeed could not be taken out of the woman.

The Gilded Six-Bits 
The Gilded Six-Bits follows the story of Joe and Missy May Banks, a young and in love newlywed couple. In the beginning, their relationship is depicted as playful and affectionate. However, their marriage is threatened when Mr. Slemmons distracts Missy May with his wealth and hurts Joe's confidence. Their relationship becomes icy after Joe catches Missy May cheating with Mr. Slemmons. For months, the Banks continue on with the loss of joy and spark their relationship once had. From the outside, they seem to be a happy couple, but in reality their feelings have changed for one another. Throughout their struggle, Joe still holds onto Mr. Slemmons' gold coin, symbolizing how the affair is still a wedge in their marriage. Later, it is discovered that the gold coin is not as valuable as it was originally believed to be, meaning that the foundation for Missy May's infidelity has only left them with estrangement. However, their marriage reaches a turning point months later when she gives birth to a son who is the spitting image of Joe. In the end, though their marriage went through a great deal, but their love proved to withstand the turmoil and they were stronger because of it. The love between Joe and Missy May was not gilded, but a genuine love.

She Rock 
She Rock is told as a form similar to what a person would find in the Old Testament. In the story, a man named Oscar had decided to leave his wife, Cal'line in Sanford while he moved away to Harlem with a friend. However, on the morning that the two friends are supposed to leave, Cal'line is waiting for them at the station with her bags. Similarly to The Country in the Women, Oscar had hoped that Cal'line would change her ways and conform to Harlem upon arriving. He sees Harlem as an opportunity to date as many women as he wishes while remaining married. He desired to take a mistress and once he did, Cal'line plotted and waited patiently. After claiming to others that he had changed Cal'line, she followed him with an axe, forcing him out of a party. The story ends with Cal'line retaliating violently against the mistress.

The Fire and the Cloud 
The final short story is a take on a conversation between the well-known Bible character, Moses, and a lizard. Moses is seated upon his grave watching his people travel to Canaan when the lizard approaches. The lizard asked him several questions, but walked away when realizing that Moses was not listening and his head was in the clouds. When the lizard returns, he finds Moses again and discovers that he has powers because he has the ability to summon flies when the lizard is hungry. Moses explains that he came from Moab and shared all that he had done in his life, making the lizard believe that Moses must be widely loved. Moses was chosen by God to lead but does not understand why. Moses explains to the lizard that Joshua could possibly love him and will follow in his footsteps. When asked, Moses shares that at times his service did bring him great joy, but his people continuously tried to undermine him, causing him to lose his strength. Moses returns to the clouds and is left feeling worried about the impression he has made on the world.

Reception 
A review of Hurston's novel was featured on The Guardian in the article, "Hitting a Straight Lick with a Crooked Stick, by Zora Neale Hurston review - wickedly funny," written by Colin Grant. Grant begins his review by explaining how eight of the short stories from Hurston's collection are recovered from the Harlem Renaissance anecdotes from the 1920s and 1930s. Grant goes on to provide examples and analysis as to how specific tales such as Sweat, and The Country in the Woman, support Hurston's theme of "feisty women" overcoming abusive men in their lives. Grant also explains how Muttsy, and In Under the Bridge, are examples of Hurston's critique of relationships and the treatment of women. Grant also highlights how Hurston brings attention to themes of self-loathing and "deference to whites that pervade black communities." Additionally, Grant points out how jealousy is a frequent theme in Hurston's tales as she warns readers of its effects. Lastly, Colin Grant also addresses how the editor chose not to change the original grammatical idiosyncrasies of Hurston's writings. Hurston wrote in a way that is reflective of the Floridian vernacular of her hometown, Eatonville, which Grant claims adds "an edge" to the tales.

Additionally, Jabari Asim says in his article, "The Harlem Renaissance Through Zora Neale Hurston's Eyes," for The New York Times how Hitting a Straight Lick with a Crooked Stick paved the way for Zora Neale Hurston's status as an icon. The short stories are presented in the order the were written, showing her growth as an author as she created more works. Asim commends Hurston for finding humor in the midst of tragedy, but acknowledges how this humor could become confusing for uninformed audiences. Asim highlights how Hurston creates characters who survive in the midst of mayhem, navigate the feelings of love, and face obstacles. There is a "willingness to live" in Hurston's characters as she shared the stories of everyday black people doing normal, mundane things.

References 

Wikipedia Student Program
Works by Zora Neale Hurston
Books published posthumously
Amistad Press books